Collinston is a village in Morehouse Parish, Louisiana, United States. The population was 327 at the 2000 census. It is part of the Bastrop Micropolitan Statistical Area.

Geography
Collinston is located at  (32.690121, -91.871583).

Demographics

As of the census of 2000, there were 327 people, 132 households, and 83 families residing in the village. The racial makeup of the village was 53.82% White, 45.87% African American, and 0.31% from two or more races. Hispanic or Latino of any race were 3.36% of the population.

There were 132 households, out of which 24.2% had children under the age of 18 living with them, 40.2% were married couples living together, 18.2% had a female householder with no husband present, and 36.4% were non-families. 32.6% of all households were made up of individuals, and 14.4% had someone living alone who was 65 years of age or older. The average household size was 2.48 and the average family size was 3.18.

In the village, the population was spread out, with 24.2% under the age of 18, 11.3% from 18 to 24, 23.2% from 25 to 44, 25.4% from 45 to 64, and 15.9% who were 65 years of age or older. The median age was 39 years. For every 100 females, there were 90.1 males. For every 100 females age 18 and over, there were 77.1 males.

The median income for a household in the village was $17,500, and the median income for a family was $31,042. Males had a median income of $29,844 versus $15,000 for females. The per capita income for the village was $11,686. About 20.9% of families and 31.8% of the population were below the poverty line, including 50.0% of those under age 18 and 21.1% of those age 65 or over.

References

External links
 Collinston Progress Community Progress Site for Collinston, LA

Villages in Morehouse Parish, Louisiana
Villages in Louisiana